is a Japanese footballer currently playing as a midfielder for Suzuka Point Getters.

Career statistics

Club
.

Notes

References

External links

1998 births
Living people
Japanese footballers
Association football midfielders
J3 League players
Giravanz Kitakyushu players
Suzuka Point Getters players